Nick Grono (born 22 July 1966) is an Australian human rights campaigner who heads the Freedom Fund – the world's first private donor fund dedicated to ending slavery. He is also the co-chair of the Jo Cox Foundation, and a board member of Girls Not Brides, the Global Partnership to End Child Marriage.

Grono, who trained as a lawyer, served as Chief of Staff to the Australian Attorney-General.  He went on to take a senior position at the International Crisis Group, the world's leading conflict resolution NGO.  As CEO of the Walk Free Foundation, he helped launch the first ever Global Slavery Index.

Grono has been CEO of Freedom Fund since January 2014.

Early years 
Grono spent a number of years growing up on the square-rigged sailing ship “Eye of the Wind” (built 1911). With his father as captain, Grono sailed from England to Australia from October 1976 to December 1977, accompanied by his mother, younger brother and 25 other crew members. The trip took them to the West Indies, the Panama Canal, the Galapagos, Easter Island, Pitcairn, Tahiti and Vanuatu, and many others. He and his family repeated the voyage in 1981/1982, this time also taking part in the filming of “Nate and Hayes” in Fiji with actor Tommy Lee Jones.

Early career 
Grono received a law degree with first class honours from the University of Sydney.  He also holds a Masters in Public Policy from Princeton University.
He began his career as a lawyer in Perth, Western Australia. He then worked at Goldman Sachs in London from 1992 to 1994 as a researcher. In 1994 he returned to Australia to work as a lawyer, eventually becoming the Chief of Staff and National Security Adviser to the Australian Attorney-General (from 1999 to 2001).

Activism work 
In 2003, Grono began working for the International Crisis Group, the world's leading conflict prevention NGO based in Brussels, Belgium.  He became the Deputy President and COO in 2008, responsible for the oversight and management of the organisation's programmes and operations in nearly thirty countries around the world.  As part of this role, he testified on conflict and human rights issues before the European, UK, Dutch, and Australian Parliaments.

He joined the Walk Free Foundation as its CEO in 2012. During his time as the CEO, the Walk Free movement gained over 5 million supporters. In 2013, the Foundation launched the first ever Global Slavery Index.
Grono has written widely on international justice, conflict prevention, human rights, and modern slavery in the New York Times, The Guardian, Foreign Policy, Huffington Post and elsewhere. In December 2015, Grono was an expert witness before the UN Security Council at its hearing on Trafficking in Persons in Situations of Conflict.

Grono has been co-chair of the Jo Cox Foundation since late 2016, and a board member of Girls Not Brides, the Global Partnership to End Child Marriage, since 2015.

The Freedom Fund 

In 2013, the Walk Free Foundation joined with Humanity United and the Legatum Foundation to establish the Freedom Fund, the world's first philanthropic fund dedicated to identifying and investing in the most effective frontline efforts to end modern slavery.
The Freedom Fund was announced by President Bill Clinton at the Clinton Global Initiative in September 2013, who declared, “This is a huge deal and we should all support this.”
The Fund focuses its work on areas where slavery is prevalent using a “hotspot” funding model. It identifies effective local anti-slavery initiatives and invests to improve their effectiveness and impact.
Global initiatives, which coordinate efforts and resources around industries where slavery is common, are also used. The Fund also strives to strengthen the global movement of activists, experts and donors by providing the platform, knowledge and tools for them to connect and work together more effectively.

The Fund has worked with some 100 frontline partners around the world to directly liberate 28,040 people from slavery and return over 57,419 at risk children back to school. Overall, its programs have positively impacted the lives of over 765,628 of those most vulnerable to exploitation.

In the years before the Walk Free Foundation Nick was with International Crisis Group (ICG)  working at its central office in Brussels.

References 

1966 births
Living people
Human rights lawyers
Australian human rights activists
Anti–human trafficking activists